The British Library Philatelic Collections is the national philatelic collection of the United Kingdom with over 8 million items from around the world. It was established in 1891 as part of the British Museum Library, later to become the British Library, with the collection of Thomas Tapling. In addition to bequests and continuing donations, the library received consistent deposits by the Crown Agency and has become a primary research collection for British Empire and international history. The collections contain a wide range of artefacts in addition to postage stamps, from newspaper stamps to a press used to print the first British postage stamps.

History

The first notable philatelic donation was in 1890 by Hubert Haes of two albums of postage stamps collected by himself and Walter Van Noorden. It was donated with the request that the British Museum library (now the British Library) would create a philatelic collection.

The following year the Collections were established with the bequest of the Tapling Collection. The probate value of the Tapling Collection was set at £12,000 but on arrival Richard Garnett (Assistant Keeper of Printed Books) estimated their value at more than £50,000 and described the bequest as the most valuable gift since the Grenville Library in 1847.

In 1900 the Crown Agents for the Colonies sent three albums of postage stamps made on their order for colonial governments and then sent specimens of all future stamps commissioned.

In 1913, the Crawford Library was received which forms the cornerstone of the British Library's philatelic literature collection, containing about 4500 works. The Crawford Library was donated by the Earl of Crawford in his Will and was the foremost collection of philatelic books in the world at the time.

In 1944 Mrs A. Cunningham donated her father's collection (Edward Mosely) of African stamps and in 1949 Mrs. Clement Williams donated her late brother's collection (H. L'Estrange Ewen) of railway letter stamps, valued at £10,000. After being offered in 1942 but delayed due to the Collections being in secure war storage, in 1951 it was announced that Mrs Augustine Fitzgerald had donated an extensive air mail collection. The Mosely and Fitzgerald collections were valued at the time at £30,000.

The Department of Printed Books had been in charge of the Philatelic Collections by default rather than design. In 1936 there was an unsuccessful proposal to move the Collections to the Department of Prints and Drawings and in 1946 there was a further proposal for the Department of Coins and Medals to take charge. No decision could be agreed and Printed Books continued to manage the Collections until they were passed to the newly formed British Library in 1973.

Curators
From 1948, H.R. Holmes had been the curator but in the late 1950s had wished to relinquish the post. A replacement curator was not easily found and the care of the Collections was managed on a part-time basis. A security crisis in 1959 developed after it was discovered that the contents of one of the frames in the Tapling Collection was missing. In 1961 James A. Mackay was recruited as a research assistant to take care of the Collections. In 1971 the police arrested Mackay (promoted to Assistant Keeper in 1965) and charged him with stealing items from the British Museum Philatelic Collections on loan from the Crown Agents. The stolen progressive proofs (test prints of stamp designs) should have been returned to the Crown Agents for destruction and were valued at £7,600. Mackay had exchanged the proofs for Winston Churchill stamps worth £400. He was fined £1,000 and dismissed from the Museum. As a result of the thefts, security was improved by recruiting Bob Schoolley-West, one of the investigating police officers. The Crown Agents withdrew their agreement for lending new stamps for display in the King's Library.

David Beech joined the British Library as a philatelic curator in 1983 and was appointed Head of the Philatelic Collections in 1991. Beech is a former President of The Royal Philatelic Society London and joint founder of the International Philatelic Libraries Association, he retired in 2013. Paul Skinner (philatelist) was appointed Curator in 2004 and became Lead Curator on the retirement of David Beech. Richard Morel joined as Curator in 2014.

Description
The material is organized in 50 collections and archives which have been acquired by donation, bequest, or transfer from Government Departments. The Collections include postage and revenue stamps, postal stationery, essays, proofs, covers and entries, "cinderella stamp" material, specimen issues, airmails, some postal history materials and official and private posts for almost all countries and periods. Philately is interpreted in its widest sense and the more unusual artefacts include original unused artwork, horse licences and the pilot's licence of Captain John Alcock.

A permanent exhibit of items from the Collections is on display in the British Library entrance area upper ground floor, which may be the best gallery of diverse classic stamps and philatelic material in the world. Approximately 80,000 items on 6,000 sheets may be viewed in 1,000 display frames; 2,400 sheets are from the Tapling Collection. Other material, which covers the whole world, is available to students and researchers by appointment.
 The British Library Philatelic Department Photograph Collection is a collection of photographs of philatelic material not in the Library's collections. Mostly composed of material donated by philatelic auctioneers, the collection is an important resource for researchers.

As well as these collections, the library actively acquires literature on the subject. This makes the British Library one of the world's leading philatelic research centres.

Principal collections

Selected notable items

The Collections include a unique proof sheet of 26 Revenue 1765 Newspaper and Pamphlet one penny impressions showing the registration certificate, held in the Board of Inland Revenue Stamping Department Archive. These were issued to apply the Stamp Act of 1765 intended to raise taxes to fund the defence of the American Colonies from the French. The tax applied to legal documents, licences, newspapers, pamphlets and almanacs in the American Colonies, Quebec, Nova Scotia, Newfoundland, Florida, the Bahamas and the West Indian Islands. The taxes resulted in public protest and rioting. The tax was abandoned after a few months due to its unpopularity but the political damage contributed to the War of Independence in 1775.

The largest object in the British Library is the Perkins D cylinder press developed by Jacob Perkins and patented in 1819. This press was one of several used to print the first postage stamps of Great Britain and Ireland which were issued in 1840. The press was used for printing many early stamps for British Colonial territories from 1853 including for Cape of Good Hope, Ceylon, Mauritius, St Helena, Trinidad, Western Australia, Ionian Islands, New Brunswick, New South Wales, New Zealand and Victoria.

The £1 stamp issued in Jamaica (1956–1958) in the reign of King George VI shows Tobacco Growing and Cigar Making. The first stamp for Queen Elizabeth II was to be in the same design (chocolate and violet) but was abandoned after printing. There are only seven examples in existence.

The cover of the British Library pocket guide Treasures in Focus - Stamps features the 1913 King George V seahorse master dye proof, part of the Harrison Collection. The engraver, J.A.C. Harrison, took proofs during the creation of the die of which this image is one. The engraving was used on the high value stamps 2/6, 5/-, 10/- and £1.

The Collections feature these rarities which demonstrate international scope:
 Gold Coast: 1883 (May) 1d on 4d magenta, unique
 India: 1854 4 annas blue and pale red, error head inverted, two used on a cover, unique.
 Mauritius 1847 1d red used on cover and 2d blue, the "Post Office" issue 1d. orange-red, used on cover. The first British Colonial postage stamps were issued in Mauritius in 1847.
 New South Wales: 1850 1d and 3d essays of the Sydney View issue. The first stamps of New South Wales, being 1d, 2d and 3d values, were issued in 1850.
 Spain: 1851 2 reales, error of colour, one of three known.
 St Helena: 1961 Tristan Relief Fund 5c.+6d., 7½c.+9d., and 10c.+1/-, used on a postcard. Only the Colonial Office in London could authorize new stamps, a fact clearly unknown to the Governor, and the issue was withdrawn. These are among the rarest of modern stamps as only 434 sets were sold.
 Switzerland: Zurich: 1843 4 rappen, the unique unsevered horizontal strip of five.
 Uruguay: 1858 120 centavos blue and 180 centavos green, in tête-bêche pairs, two of five known.
 Western Australia: 1854-55 4d blue, error frame inverted.
 United States of America - Inverted Jenny, one of a set of 100 postage stamps first issued on May 10, 1918, with probably the most famous error in American philately and one of the most expensive stamps ever produced

See also
 List of philatelic libraries
 National Philatelic Collection (United States)
 Philately
 Royal Philatelic Society London

References and sources
References

Sources

External links

 British Library Philatelic Collections introduction

 
Philatelic libraries
Philatelic museums